The Flash Stakes was an important and prestigious race for two-year-old Thoroughbred horses and one of the longest running horse racing events in America.  Run before races were graded, the Flash was won by a host of starry names.  Begun before the United States Hotel Stakes (also now removed from racing's roster), it was the oldest race for juveniles of either gender in the US.  

Once a historic fixture in Saratoga Springs, New York at the Saratoga Race Course, it was eliminated in 2005 by the New York Racing Association (NYRA), which feared bankruptcy.  

Moved from its home in Saratoga after a long absence, the Grade III Flash had raced on at Belmont Park as a five furlong sprint on the main track for a $100,000 added purse until the NYRA's 2005 decision.

Winners since 1999

Earlier winners

 1983 : 1998 - Not Run
 1982 – Victorious 
 1981 – Ringaro
 1972 : 1980 – Not Run
 1971 – Riva Ridge 
 1969 – Pontifex
 1967 – Forward Pass
 1966 – Bold Hour
 1965 – Indulto
 1964 – New Act
 1963 – Irvkup
 1962 –  Catullus
 1961 – Jaipur
 1960 – Not Run
 1959 – Greek Page
 1958 – First Minister
 1957 – Wing Jet
 1956 – Missile
 1955 – Reneged
 1954 – Laugh
 1953 – Card Trick
 1952 – Native Dancer
 1951 – Cousin
 1950 – Northern Star
 1949 – Greek Ship
 1948 – Algasir
 1947 – Star Bout
 1946 – Gestapo
 1945 – Assault
 1944 – Plebiscite
 1943 – Tropea
 1942 – Breezing Home
 1941 – Amphitheater 
 1940 – Overdrawn
 1939 – Epatant
 1938 – Eight Thirty
 1937 – Maetall 
 1936 – Maedic
 1935 – Red Rain
 1934 – Pitter Pat
 1933 – Elylee
 1932 – Happy Gal
 1931 – Irenes Bob
 1930 – Jamestown
 1929 – Gallant Fox
 1928 – Jack High
 1927 – Distraction
 1926 – Osmand
 1925 – Sarmaticus
 1924 – Felix 
 1923 – Lord Baltimore
 1922 – Dust Flower
 1921 – Miss Joy
 1920 – Moody
 1919 – Miss Jemima
 1918 – Billy Kelly
 1917 – Papp
 1916 – Rickety
 1915 – Prince of Como
 1914 – Trial By Jury
 1913 – Old Rosebud 
 1912 – Not Run
 1911 – Not Run
 1910 – Semproius
 1909 – Waldo 
 1908 –  Edward
 1907 – Fair Play
 1906 – Peter Pan
 1905 – Burgomaster
 1904 – Sysonby
 1902 – Judith Campbell
 1901 – Goldsmith
 1900 – Not Run
 1899 – Not Run
 1898 – Not Run
 1897 – Hamburg
 1896 – Not Run
 1895 – Oranetto 
 1894 – Lisa II
 1893 – Galilee
 1892 – Nick
 1890 – Sir John 
 1889 – Protection
 1888 – Princess Bowling
 1887 – King Fish
 1886 – Agnes
 1885 – Primero
 1884 – Volante 
 1883 – Burton
 1882 – George Kinney
 1881 – Memento 
 1879 – Sensation
 1878 – Harold
 1877 – Duke of Magenta
 1875 – Faithless
 1874 – Olitapa
 1873 – Regardless 
 1872 – Tom Bowling
 1870 – Ratan
 1869 – Remorseless 

Horse races in the United States
Discontinued horse races in New York (state)
Belmont Park
Flat horse races for two-year-olds
Previously graded stakes races in the United States